Slowness is the seventh studio album by Hong Kong recording artist Kay Tse. It was released on 21 December 2009, by Cinepoly Records. The theme of the album is slowness, pointing out how life in urban cities is becoming increasingly restless and fast-paced. Tse worked with several producers in this album, most notably her frequent collaborator, the songwriter Adrain Chow. He is also the executive producer for the album. Musically, the album consists of slow-tempo cantopop while incorporating jazz elements.

The first single from Slowness, "Living" <<活著>>, was a critical success, which reached number one in three of the four major charts of Hong Kong. Three more singles were released which received moderate success. Tse promoted the album by  promoting the songs in a number of live appearances, including a mini-concert series.

Track listing

Singles

^ Single was unable to chart due to disagreement between Universal Music Group and TVB

Kay Tse albums